Château Hourtin-Ducasse is a vineyard in Saint-Sauveur, Gironde, Nouvelle-Aquitaine, France. It forms part of the Haut-Médoc AOC.

Wineries of France